A crepe is a pancake.

Crepe, crêpe may also refer to:
 Crêpe, a woven fabric
 Crepe, a musical act associated with The Embassy (band)
 Crepe myrtle or crape myrtle, common names for Lagerstroemia, a genus of trees and shrubs
 Crêpe paper, a paper
 Crepe rubber, used to make soles for shoes and other rubber products